Kusekeyevo (Küsäkäy) is a rural locality (a selo) and the administrative centre of Kusekeyevsky Selsoviet, Birsky District, Bashkortostan, Russia. The population was 504 as of 2010. There are 11 streets.

Geography 
Kusekeyevo is located 16 km west of Birsk (the district's administrative centre) by road. Kandakovka is the nearest rural locality.

References 

Rural localities in Birsky District